is a women's football club playing in Japan's football league, Challenge League. Its hometown is the city of Kagoshima, Kagoshima.

Squad

Current squad
As of June 7, 2015

Results

Transition of team name

FC Asahina : 1992 - 2002
Kagoshima Kamoike FC Asahina : 2003 - 2008
Je Vrille Kagoshima : 2009 – Present

References

External links 
 Je Vrille Kagoshima official site
 Japanese Club Teams

Women's football clubs in Japan
1992 establishments in Japan
Sports teams in Kagoshima Prefecture
Kagoshima
Association football clubs established in 1992